This article lists films set in ancient Greek culture, including Magna Graecia and Hellenistic kingdoms.

Bronze Age and mythistoricals

Classical Greece

Hellenistic period

See also
 List of films set in ancient Rome
 List of films set in ancient Egypt
 List of films based on classical mythology
 List of films based on Greek drama
 Fiction set in ancient Greece
 Fiction set in ancient Rome
 Lists of historical films

Films set in ancient Greece
Films
Greece
Films by period of setting